The Asir magpie (Pica asirensis), also known as the Arabian magpie, is a highly endangered species of magpie endemic to Saudi Arabia. It is only found in the country's southwestern highlands, in the Asir Region. It occurs only in African juniper forest in well-vegetated wadis and valleys. It was formerly classified as a subspecies of the Eurasian magpie (Pica pica), and still is by many authorities. This species is highly threatened by habitat destruction, as its native forests are not regenerating. Tourism development and climate change are also posing a threat. Only 135 pairs (270 mature individuals) are known to survive in the wild, and this number is declining.

A molecular phylogenetic study published in 2018 found that the Asir magpie was a sister taxon to the black-rumped magpie that is found on the Tibetan Plateau.

Description 
The Asir magpie (Pica asirensis) is about 45-60 cm long, and its approximate weight is 240 g. Its head, neck, back, front chest, and feet are all black. Its shoulders and belly are milk white. Its tail is black with bronze-green metallic luster. Compared to Eurasian magpie, the Asir magpie has longer bill, darker plumage, and darker iris. Its vocalization is distinct, and it also gives harsh high-pitched calls. There is no large difference between males and females, but young Asir magpies are duller than adults.

Behavior 
During breeding seasons, the Asir magpies often group in pairs and live in flocks. Each of the flock approximately contains 8 birds. However, the Asir magpies travel in small groups of 3-5 birds for daily activities. In order to protect themselves from predators such as hawks and owls, they build their nests in forests and valleys with plentiful vegetation covered.

Compared to flying, the Asir magpies prefer walking and hopping sideways. Since their size is small and their wings are short, they fly with fast wing beats, and they rarely glide.

Habitat 
Asir magpie primarily lives above 2150 m in thick shady juniper forests or dense mixed forests. It usually lives on south-facing slopes and avoids living on slopes larger than 30 degrees or near a human site. Sometimes, the Asir magpie is also observed foraging on roadsides or living at 1800 m and higher.

Diet 
The Asir magpie is omnivorous. Its diet varies according to the changes in seasons and environments. When it is summer, the Asir magpie mainly feeds on animal-based food such as invertebrates, lizards, and frogs. During the other three seasons, it relies on the seeds and products of plants. The Asir magpie’s food source is not limited, and it just eats the food which is available and abundant in the living environment. It even steals and eats the eggs of other birds, which gives the species the name “nest predators”.

Status 
As a highly endangered species, there are only 270 Asir Magpie estimated to exist, and the extent of occurrence (breeding/resident) has shrunk to 42,700 km². When Bates(1936) first recorded the Asir magpie, the bird’s living range extended from Tayif in the north to at least Abha in the south - a distance of 400 km. Today, the great majority of the population appears to be confined to pockets of mixed juniper and acacia forests within a 37 km strip of highlands, primarily between An-Namas and Billasmar. A high degree of habitat fragmentation from tourism development and urban expansion poses a great threat to its existence by restraining the exchange of genetic materials between groups from different habitats. Moreover, the Asir magpies suffer from malnutrition as a result of feeding on human food wastes, which potentially leads to extinction of the species.

See also 
 Asir Mountains, Sarat range

References 

Asir magpie
Birds of the Arabian Peninsula
Endemic fauna of Saudi Arabia
Asir magpie
Taxa named by George Latimer Bates